Johan Fredrik Grøgaard (born 27 October 1934, Oslo) is a Norwegian dentist, novelist, children's writer and crime writer. He made his literary debut in 1967 with the novel Dyvekes grav, for which he received Tarjei Vesaas' debutantpris. He received the Norwegian Critics Prize for Best children's book in 1982 for Jeg, Wilhem, 11 år.

Notable works
1967: Dyveks grav
1971: Elefantspråket & andre dikt (The Elephant's language & other poems)
1972: Mannen som ikke kunne kose seg (The Man who couldn't have fun)
1976: Skorpionens brodd (The scorpion's brought)
1980: Ser Deg på TV: Fortellinger fra Norden (See you on TV: Stories from the North)
1982: Invitt til vellyst (Invended to the will)
1982: Jeg, Wilhelm, 11 år (Me, Wilhelm, age 11)
1989: Jan Erik Vold, 50
2010: Kong Rad, eller Professor Andresens ratt (King Rad, or Professor Andresen's line

References

20th-century Norwegian novelists
Norwegian children's writers
Norwegian Critics Prize for Literature winners
1934 births
Living people